Rosebush is a former community in Sherman County, Oregon, United States. It is contemporarily considered a ghost town.

References

Former populated places in Sherman County, Oregon
Ghost towns in Oregon
Unincorporated communities in Sherman County, Oregon